The following Forbes list of Norwegian billionaires is based on an annual assessment of wealth and assets compiled and published by Forbes magazine in 2022.

2022 Norwegian billionaires list

See also
 Forbes list of billionaires
 List of countries by the number of billionaires

References

Lists of people by wealth
Net worth
Economy of Norway-related lists